Surpassing Certainty: What My Twenties Taught Me is a 2017 memoir by Janet Mock. Following on her 2014 memoir, Redefining Realness, which described Mock's childhood and adolescence, Surpassing Certainty deals with her early adulthood. It received favorable reviews.

Publication 
Published June 13, 2017 by the Atria imprint of Simon & Schuster, Surpassing Certainty is Mock's second memoir, following her 2014 New York Times bestseller Redefining Realness. The book's title is an allusion to Audre Lorde, who wrote, "And at last you'll know with surpassing certainty that only one thing is more frightening than speaking your truth. And that is not speaking."

Content 
Following on the discussion of her childhood and adolescence in Redefining Realness, in Surpassing Certainty, Mock describes life in her twenties.

Reception 
Writing in The New York Times, Jennifer Finney Boylan described Surpassing Certainty as "position[ing] its story within a larger history of a struggle for human rights. But Mock’s book is also a work of the heart, much of it focusing on the dissolution of her first marriage, and her journey from a Honolulu strip club to an editor at People magazine." Cosmopolitan said the book "should be required reading for your 20s." Elle named to a list of three "must-read" books for June 2017.

References

2017 non-fiction books
Transgender autobiographies
American memoirs
2010s LGBT literature
LGBT literature in the United States
Literature by African-American women
African-American autobiographies
Atria Publishing Group books